Balyasakhi is a 1954 Indian Malayalam-language film, directed by Antony Mitradas and produced by P. Subramaniam. The film stars Prem Nazir and Miss Kumari. The film had musical score by Br. Lakshmanan and lyrics were written by Thirunainarkurichy Madhavan Nair.

Cast
 Prem Nazir as Vijayan
 Kumari Thankam
 S. P. Pillai
 Miss Kumari 
 Vanchiyoor Madhavan Nair
 Jose Prakash
 Sebastian Kunjukunju Bhagavathar
 T. S. Muthaiah
 Adoor Pankajam
 Aranmula Ponnamma
 Baby Indira
 Bahadoor
 Master Hari
 Veeran
 Snehalatha
 Saraswathi

References

External links
 

1954 films
1950s Malayalam-language films
Indian thriller films
1950s thriller films
Films directed by Antony Mitradas
Films scored by Br Lakshmanan